The Financial Alliance for Women (formerly the Global Banking Alliance for Women or GBA) is a non-profit organization working as an international consortium of financial institutions interested in the female economy. Its members work in more than 135 countries to build programs that support women with access to capital, information, education and markets. The organization is headquartered in Brooklyn, New York.

History and leadership
The Alliance was established in 2000 by a network of banks. In November 2012, Inez Murray was appointed as its chief executive officer. She previously worked for Women's World Banking. The Alliance is also guided by a governing board.

Services and programs
The Alliance works with a range of financial institutions to bank women and support women entrepreneurs. Members include Westpac in Australia, BLC Bank in Lebanon, Access Bank in Nigeria, Standard Chartered and NatWest Group in the United Kingdom, Banco Popular in the United States, Itaú Unibanco in Brazil, and the European Bank for Reconstruction and Development.

Sponsors 
The Financial Alliance for Women is sponsored by:
 Data2X
 FMO
 International Development Research Centre
 The International Finance Corporation

References

External links
Official Site
 World Bank: Women's Access to Financial Services

Banking organizations
International non-profit organizations
Banking institutes
Non-profit organizations based in New York City